Johan Frederik Møller, also J. F. Møller, (20 August 1797 - 14 October 1871) was a Danish painter and photographer.

Biography
Møller was born in Helsingør.  He was the son of Peter Møller and Christine Olsdatter. His father was a customs officer. He trained as a clerk at the District office in Aarhus, and in 1824 trained as a portrait painter at the Royal Danish Academy of Fine Arts. He exhibited at the Charlottenborg Spring Exhibition  between 1828 and 1867.

Møller primarily painted portraits. Notable portraits included those of Crown Prince Frederik Carl Christian  (1836, Jægerspris Castle),
author Hans Christian Andersen (1847), playwright Adam Oehlenschläger (1830, Frederiksborg Museum), industrialist Jacob Holm and opera soprano Eleonora Zrza.

He served in 1844 as daguerreotypist in Elsinore, and in 1850 as a photographer, both in Elsinore and Copenhagen.

He was married in 1834 to Emilie Albertine Martens (1810-1882). He was the father of Johan Christian Møller (1835-1902)  who became Head of the Army Medical Corps and in 1895 served as Surgeon General.

Johan Frederik Møller died in Copenhagen and was  buried in Assistants Cemetery.

References

19th-century Danish painters
Danish male painters
1882 deaths
1797 births
People from Helsingør
Royal Danish Academy of Fine Arts alumni
19th-century Danish male artists